Edward Knowles may refer to:
 Edward Knowles (rugby), English rugby union and rugby league player
 Edward Knowles (Royal Navy officer)
 Edward P. Knowles, mayor of Providence, Rhode Island